Rebecca Podos is an American author of young adult fiction and a literary agent, best known for her Lambda Literary Award-winning novel Like Water.

Career 
Podos is a literary agent at Rees Literary Agency.

Her debut young adult novel, The Mystery of Hollow Places, is a thriller about a 17-year-old teen whose father, a best-selling mystery author, goes missing. Deciding that her father has gone to track down her mother, who abandoned them when she was a baby, she follows the clues she believes her father left behind in order to find them both.  It was published by Balzer + Bray in 2016. The Mystery of Hollow Places received starred reviews from Kirkus Reviews, Booklist, and Bulletin of the Center for Children's Books.

Podos' second novel, Like Water, is about a bisexual Mexican-American teen who becomes a performing mermaid in a theme park, where she meets and falls for a genderqueer teen. It was published by Balzer + Bray in 2017 and won a Lambda Literary Award in 2018.

Bibliography 
Young Adult novels

 The Mystery of Hollow Places (Balzer + Bray, 2016)
 Like Water (Balzer + Bray, 2017)
 The Wise and the Wicked (Balzer + Bray, 2019)
The Dust Alphabet (Balzer + Bray, 2021)

Short fiction

 "The Fourth" in Glimmer Train Stories #84, edited by Susan Burmeister-Brown and Linda B. Swanson-Davies (Glimmer Train Press, 2012)

Awards 
2018

Lambda Literary Award for LGBTQ Children's/Young Adult for Like Water

References 

Year of birth missing (living people)
Living people
Women writers of young adult literature
21st-century American women writers
Lambda Literary Award for Children's and Young Adult Literature winners
American LGBT writers
Emerson College alumni
Literary agents